The 1993 New Hampshire Wildcats football team was an American football team that represented the University of New Hampshire as a member of the New England Division of the Yankee Conference during the 1993 NCAA Division I-AA football season. In its 22nd year under head coach Bill Bowes, the team compiled a 6–5 record (4–4 against conference opponents) and finished in fourth place in the New England Division.

Schedule

References

New Hampshire
New Hampshire Wildcats football seasons
New Hampshire Wildcats football